Santiago Sanz (born 27 June 1979) is an Argentine former professional rugby union player who played as a flanker. Born in Buenos Aires, he played for Club Atlético San Isidro, and also earned six caps for the Argentina national team. He also played 55 times for the Argentina sevens team, scoring 13 tries and a conversion for a total of 67 points.

References

External links
Profile at ESPNscrum

1979 births
Living people
Rugby union players from Buenos Aires
Argentine rugby union players
Rugby union flankers
Club Atlético San Isidro rugby union players
Argentina international rugby union players